John Karslake may refer to: 

John Burgess Karslake (1821 - 1881), English lawyer
John Karslake Karslake 19th century New Zealand politician